Massey Brothers (Pemberton) Limited was a building and manufacturing company operating through much of the 20th century. It was formed in 1904 by the brothers William, Isaac and Thomas Massey, timber merchants and building contractors based in Pemberton, Greater Manchester, two miles west of Wigan. During the first fifteen years they built schools, mills, cinemas and houses and in 1919 started with the construction of bodies for cars, vans and charabancs. In the early 1920s they were agents for Ford cars and passenger vehicles, Tilling Stevens Petrol Electric buses and Columbia Six motor cars. A number of trams and buses were built for Wigan Corporation and their coachbuilding activities increased rapidly with many new customers being supplied by the end of the decade. Their building and construction activities continued throughout this period.
By the mid thirties Masseys were supplying bodies on buses and trolleybuses mainly for municipal undertakings with occasional orders coming from independent operators. In the late thirties they built railcars for the Trujillo Railway in Peru and Railcar Cabs for The Sao Paulo Railway in Brazil. They were very active during the second world war with the building of Ministry of Supply "utility" bodies for many operators in England, Scotland and Wales plus fire brigade utility vehicles. After the war, with the need for replacement buses gaining momentum, the company became increasingly busy with repairing and building new buses and the rebuilding of bomb damaged property. Masseys had an envious reputation for solid PSV bodywork with their distinctive designs. The building and construction side of the business ceased in 1962 after the completion of some new houses but PSV bodybuilding continued until 1967 when they were taken over by another Wigan bodybuilder, Northern Counties Motor & Engineering Company.   A book by Phil Thoms on the history of Masseys was published at the end of 2011

References

Construction and civil engineering companies established in 1904
1904 establishments in England
Vehicle manufacturing companies established in 1919
Vehicle manufacturing companies disestablished in 1967
1967 disestablishments in England
Construction and civil engineering companies of England
Defunct manufacturing companies of England
1967 mergers and acquisitions
British companies established in 1904
British companies disestablished in 1967